Dum Dum Assembly constituency is an assembly constituency in North 24 Parganas district in the Indian state of West Bengal.

Overview
As per orders of the Delimitation Commission, No. 114 Dum Dum Assembly constituency is composed of the following:  Dum Dum municipality and Ward Nos.1-17 of South Dum Dum municipality.

Dum Dum Assembly constituency is part of No. 16 Dum Dum (Lok Sabha constituency).

Members of Legislative Assembly

Election results

2021

2016

2011
In the 2011 elections, Bratya Basu of Trinamool Congress defeated his nearest rival Gautam Deb of CPI(M).

.# Swing calculated on Congress+Trinamool Congress vote percentages taken together in 2006.

2006
In the 2006 elections, Rekha Goswami of CPI(M) defeated his nearest rival Udayan Namboodiry of Trinamool Congress.

.# Swing calculated on Trinamool Congress
BJP vote percentages taken together in 2006.

2001
In the 2001 elections, Arunava Ghosh of AITC defeated his nearest rival Ajit Choudhury of CPIM.

.# Swing calculated on Congress+ Trinamool
Congress vote percentages taken together in 2001.

1977-2006
In the 2006 state assembly elections, Rekha Goswami of CPI(M) won from the Dum Dum assembly constituency defeating her nearest rival Udayan Namboodiry of Trinamool Congress. Contests in most years were multi cornered but only winners and runners are being mentioned. Arunava Ghosh of Trinamool Congress defeated Ajit Chowdhury of CPI(M) in 2001. Sankar Sen of CPI(M) defeated Nitai Ghosh of Congress in 1996 and Ramesh Bhattacharjee of Congress in 1991. Santi Ranjan Ghatak of CPI(M) defeated Harashit Ghosh of Congress in 1987, and Lal Bahadur Singh of Congress in 1982 and 1977.

1951-1972
Lal Bahadur Singh of Congress won in 1972. Tarun Kumar Sengupta of CPI(M) won in 1971, 1969 and 1967. Tarun Kumar Sengupta representing CPI won in 1962. Pabitra Mohan Roy of PSP won in 1957. In independent India's first election in 1951, kanai Lal Das of Congress won from the Dum Dum constituency.

References

Assembly constituencies of West Bengal
Politics of North 24 Parganas district